The Ysaÿe Quartet was established in 1886 by Eugène Ysaÿe.

Its members were:
 Eugène Ysaÿe, 1st violin
 Mathieu Crickboom, 2nd violin
 Léon van Hout, viola 
 Joseph Jacob, cello

The quartet premiered Claude Debussy's String Quartet on December 29, 1893.

Belgian classical music groups
String quartets
Musical groups established in 1886